Depok United Football Club (simply known as DUFC or Depok United) is an Indonesian football club based in Depok, West Java. They currently compete in the Liga 3.

References

External links

Depok
Sport in West Java
Football clubs in Indonesia
Football clubs in West Java
Association football clubs established in 2011
2011 establishments in Indonesia